John Adams II (July 4, 1803 – October 23, 1834) was an American government functionary and businessman.  The second son of President John Quincy Adams and Louisa Adams, he is usually called John Adams II to distinguish him from President John Adams, his famous grandfather.

Biography
John Adams II was born in Quincy, Massachusetts, on July 4, 1803.  He studied at Harvard University, but was expelled during his senior year for participating in the 1823 student rebellion to protest the curriculum and living conditions at the university.  He then studied law under his father, and when John Quincy Adams became president, his son served as his private secretary.  (In 1873 most of the students who took part in the 1823 incident, including John Adams II, were designated "Bachelor of Arts as of 1823" and admitted to Harvard's Roll of Graduates.)

At a White House reception during the John Quincy Adams presidency, Russell Jarvis, an anti-Adams reporter for the Washington Daily Telegraph, believed that President Adams publicly insulted Mrs. Jarvis.  Since the President was considered to be immune from a dueling challenge, Jarvis attempted to initiate a duel with John Adams II, who had been at the reception.  Jarvis's effort to provoke an incident led to a highly publicized fistfight in the Capitol rotunda, with Jarvis pulling the hair and nose of and slapping Adams, and Adams refusing to retaliate. An investigating committee of the United States House of Representatives determined that Jarvis had initiated the attack, but took no other action.  Louisa Adams always believed that the negative press generated by this incident, with John Adams II being accused of cowardice by newspaper editors who supported Andrew Jackson, led to Adams' early demise. The attack on Adams was the impetus for Congress to establish the United States Capitol Police, which provides security for Congressional buildings and grounds.

John Adams II, his older brother George and his younger brother Charles were all rivals for the same woman, their cousin Mary Catherine Hellen, who lived with the John Quincy Adams family after the death of her parents.  In 1828 John married Mary Hellen at a ceremony in the White House, and both his brothers refused to attend.  John Adams II and Mary Hellen were the parents of two daughters, Mary Louisa (December 2, 1828 – July 16, 1859) and Georgiana Frances (September 10, 1830 – November 20, 1839).

Death 
After his father left the White House, John attempted a career in business, including operating a Washington flour mill owned by his father.  His lack of success and despondency over his brother George's alcoholism and 1829 suicide led to John's own descent into alcoholism.  He died in Washington, D.C. on October 23, 1834 and is buried in Quincy's Hancock Cemetery.

Mary Hellen Adams continued to reside with John Quincy and Louisa Adams and helped care for them in their old age.  She died in Bethlehem, New Hampshire, on August 31, 1870.

Family tree

Notes 

1803 births
1834 deaths
People from Quincy, Massachusetts
People from Washington, D.C.
Adams political family
Children of presidents of the United States
Harvard College alumni
Burials in Massachusetts
American people of English descent
Thomas Johnson family